D. António de Mendonça (1600 – 13 February 1675, in Lisbon) was Archbishop of Lisbon between 1670 and his death. He was the son of Nuno de Mendonça, 1st Count of Vale de Reis and was one of the main exponents in the fight against the excesses practiced by the Portuguese Inquisition.

References

External links
  
 "Patriarchal See of Lisboa". GCatholic.org.

 1600 births
 1675 deaths
 Archbishops of Lisbon
People from Lamego